is a passenger railway station located in  Minami-ku, Yokohama, Kanagawa Prefecture, Japan, operated by the private railway company Keikyū.

Lines
Koganechō Station is served by the Keikyū Main Line and is located 25.6 kilometers from the terminus of the line at Shinagawa Station in Tokyo.

Station layout
The station consists of one elevated island platform with the station building built underneath.

Platforms

History
Koganechō Station was opened on April 1, 1930.

Keikyū introduced station numbering to its stations on 21 October 2010; Koganechō Station was assigned station number KK40.

Passenger statistics
In fiscal 2019, the station was used by an average of 22,987 passengers daily. 

The passenger figures for previous years are as shown below.

Surrounding area
 Ooka River
Japan National Route 16
Kanto Gakuin Junior and Senior High School
Kanto Gakuin Elementary School

See also
 List of railway stations in Japan

References

External links

 

Railway stations in Kanagawa Prefecture
Railway stations in Japan opened in 1930
Keikyū Main Line
Railway stations in Yokohama